Agonopterix straminella is a moth of the family Depressariidae. It is found in Spain, France, Greece, North Africa and Palestina.

The wingspan is 23–24 mm.

References

Moths described in 1859
Agonopterix
Moths of Europe
Moths of Africa
Moths of the Middle East